The 1953 IRFU College Draft was the first official sports draft held by the Interprovincial Rugby Football Union, a predecessor of the East Division of the Canadian Football League, in the spring of 1953. 40 players were chosen from among eligible players from five eastern universities, McGill University, Queen's University, University of Toronto, University of Western Ontario, and McMaster University. The Montreal Alouettes had the first selection, Doug McNichol, who became the first player to be drafted to a Canadian professional football team. 

The following list only includes the first three rounds due to historical limitations.

Round one

Round two

Round three

References

Canadian College Draft
1953 in Canadian football